A Bilby tower is a type of steel survey tower used by the United States Coast and Geodetic Survey from 1927 to 1984. It is named after Jasper S. Bilby who designed it in 1926. In 1927, Herbert Hoover, then the  Secretary of Commerce, commended Bilby's tower "for its cost and time efficiency" and cited the surveyor's service as "essential to the United States government".

Features
The Bilby tower has two unconnected parts – an internal tower for mounting surveying instruments and an external tower for surveyors. This separation allowed for isolating the instruments from the vibrations induced by people, which increased the precision of measurements.

It was portable, reusable and quick to assemble and dismantle. Its quick erection made it possible to conduct surveying rapidly.

The last Bilby tower
The last remaining tower, at St. Charles Parish, Louisiana, was dismantled by the Surveyors Historical Society in 2012 and re-erected in 2013 at the Osgood Trails Park in Osgood, Indiana, the home town of Bilby.

See also
Triangulation (surveying)
Triangulation station

References 

Towers
Surveying instruments
Surveying of the United States